DFS ("DFS Group") is a Hong Kong-based travel retailer of luxury products. Established in 1960, its network consists of over 420 locations, including duty-free stores in 12 major airports and 23 downtown Galleria stores, as well as affiliate and resort locations. It is privately held and majority owned by the luxury conglomerate Moët Hennessy Louis Vuitton (LVMH), alongside DFS co-founder and shareholder Robert Warren Miller. As of January 11, 1997, DFS Group operates as a subsidiary of LVMH.

DFS is headquartered in Hong Kong SAR and has offices in Australia, Cambodia, mainland China, France, Indonesia, Italy, Japan, Macau, New Zealand, Singapore, United Arab Emirates, United States of America and Vietnam. DFS Group employs over 5,000 people, operating in 14 countries worldwide. In 2017, nearly 160 million travelers visited DFS stores.

History

Beginnings 
In 1960, American entrepreneurs Charles Feeney and Robert Warren Miller founded Tourists International, which later became Duty Free Shoppers (DFS), in Hong Kong. Minority owners included Alan Parker with a 20% stake, and Anthony M. Pilaro who held 2.5%. The entrepreneurs anticipated the growing spending power of military servicemen as well as the rise of international travelers from Asia, following vast improvements in international air travel after World War II. In 1962, two DFS stores were opened at the international airports in Hong Kong and Honolulu, the first duty-free shop in the United States.

Expansion and re-branding 
In the 1960s and 1970s DFS Group significantly expanded their operation in Eurasia and North America. DFS capitalized on the rising wave of Asian tourists who began to travel further overseas, opening stores in international airports and later in downtown locations where travelers have their purchases delivered before departure. In 1968, DFS opened its first downtown duty-free store in Kowloon, Hong Kong, followed shortly thereafter by Honolulu and eventually expanding to 14 locations all over the world. In 2005, branded halls opened in Okinawa, Japan, launching a new shop-in-shop concept for DFS Gallerias. In 2010, "DFS University" was established for its sales associates.

In 2013 DFS reached 420 locations worldwide and undertook a major branding initiative setting the stage for the next generation of expansion. It re-branded its downtown Galleria Stores “T Galleria” and moved to a strategy of localization for airports, working with local suppliers to increase its mix of “destination” products. In 2015 DFS opened its first transformational wines and spirits duplex store at Singapore Changi Airport, including a Long Bar by Raffles. In the same year, it also launched T Galleria Beauty by DFS, a standalone beauty concept store in Hong Kong and Macau.

In 2016 DFS expanded its operations, opening T Galleria Angkor in Siem Reap, Cambodia, a significantly extended space at T Galleria by DFS, City of Dreams in Macau, and its first European store, T Fondaco dei Tedeschi in Venice, Italy.
In 2017 it announced plans to open in Paris in 2020 within the renovated La Samaritaine complex.

In January 2021, Benjamin Vuchot returned to DFS as Chairman and CEO after three years as President of Sephora Asia. Both DFS and Sephora are businesses under LVMH's Selective Retailing division.

In January 2021, DFS opened its first downtown duty-free store in Hainan Island, China, in partnership with Shenzhen Duty Free Group.

Within a few months, DFS also announced that it would open two new Galleria stores in Oceania by the end of 2022: one in Brisbane, Australia, and another in Queenstown, New Zealand.

In June 2021, despite the tourism downturn caused by the COVID-19 pandemic, DFS opened its most significant and ambitious store to date, Samaritaine Paris Pont-Neuf in the heart of the French capital. The 150-year-old building, which was meticulously restored over 16 years, was inaugurated on June 21 by French President Emmanuel Macron and LVMH Group head Bernard Arnault.

Acquisition 
In 1996, LVMH acquired the majority share of DFS Group, buying out partners Feeney, Parker, and Pilaro and setting a new focus on the combined elements of travel and luxury. It developed a merchandising strategy based around five core “pillars” – Beauty and Fragrances; Fashion and Accessories; Watches and Jewelry; Spirits, Wine and Tobacco; and Food and Gifts – and a new tagline, “The Traveler's Luxury Department Store”. It also created an annual “Masters Series”, showcasing the best products across all its categories and convening leading brand representatives, top customers, media and industry analysts in a celebration of luxury. In 2004, the company moved its headquarters to Hong Kong from San Francisco, California as part of a corporate restructure.

Locations 
DFS Group operates approximately 420 duty-free boutiques at 12 international airports, 23 downtown Galleria stores and several resort locations around the world.

Greater China 
 Times DF x DFS Haikou Mission Hills Duty-Free Complex, Hainan, China
 T Galleria by DFS, Canton Road, Hong Kong
 T Galleria by DFS, Tsim Sha Tsui East, Hong Kong
 T Galleria Beauty by DFS, Causeway Bay, Hong Kong
 T Galleria by DFS, City of Dreams, Macau
 T Galleria by DFS, Shoppes at Four Seasons, Macau
 T Galleria by DFS, Studio City, Macau
 T Galleria Beauty by DFS, Galaxy Macau, Macau
 T Galleria Beauty by DFS, MGM Cotai, Macau
 T Galleria Beauty by DFS, MGM Grand, Macau
 T Galleria Beauty by DFS, Wynn Palace, Macau

Japan 
 T Galleria by DFS, Okinawa, Japan
 DFS, Naha Airport, Okinawa, Japan
 TIAT Duty Free, Haneda International Airport, Tokyo, Japan
 JAL Duty Free, Narita International Airport, Tokyo, Japan

Asia (Other)
 T Galleria by DFS, Angkor, Siem Reap, Cambodia
 DFS, Ngurah Rai International Airport, Bali, Indonesia
 T Galleria by DFS, Bali, Indonesia
 T Galleria by DFS, Singapore
 DFS, Singapore Cruise Centre, Tanah Merah, Singapore
 DFS, Singapore Cruise Centre, HarbourFront, Singapore
 DFS, Singapore Changi Airport, Singapore
 Halong Bay Cruise Terminal, Ha Long Bay, Vietnam
 Phu Quoc International Airport, Phu Quoc, Vietnam
 NASCO Duty Free, Noi Bai International Airport, Hanoi City, Vietnam
 SASCO Duty Free, Tan Son Nhat International Airport, Ho Chi Minh City, Vietnam

South Pacific 
 T Galleria by DFS, Guam
 DFS, Saipan International Airport, Saipan
 T Galleria by DFS, Saipan

North America 
 T Galleria by DFS, Honolulu, Hawaii
 DFS, Honolulu International Airport, Honolulu, Hawaii
 DFS, Kahului Airport, Kahului, Hawaii
 DFS, San Francisco International Airport, San Francisco, California
 DFS, Los Angeles International Airport, Los Angeles, California
 DFS, John F. Kennedy International Airport, New York City

Australia and New Zealand 
 T Galleria, by DFS, Cairns, Australia
 T Galleria, by DFS, Sydney, Australia
 T Galleria, by DFS, Auckland, New Zealand
 T Galleria, by DFS, Queenstown, New Zealand

Europe 
 Samaritaine Paris Pont-Neuf by DFS, Paris, France
 T Fondaco dei Tedeschi, Venice, Italy

Middle East 
 DFS, Abu Dhabi International Airport, UAE

Awards and recognition 
In 2015, DFS Group was awarded "Best Technology Platform" under the Best Treasury and Finance Strategies in Asia Pacific category at The Corporate Treasurer Awards. In 2017 it received the 19th Duty-Free News International (DFNI) Asia/Pacific Awards for Travel-Retail Excellence.

See also
 List of duty-free shops

References

External links 
 

Duty-free shops
Retail companies of Hong Kong
Retail companies established in 1960
1960 establishments in Hong Kong
LVMH brands